1997 Kashiwa Reysol season

Competitions

Domestic results

J.League

Emperor's Cup

J.League Cup

Player statistics

 † player(s) joined the team after the opening of this season.

Transfers

In:

Out:

Transfers during the season

In
Elpídio Pereira da Silva Filho (from Atlético Mineiro on May)
Kensuke Nebiki (loan return from Independiente)

Out
Antônio (on April)
Edílson (on October)
Takumi Morikawa (loan to a Brazilian club on December)

Awards
none

References
J.LEAGUE OFFICIAL GUIDE 1997, 1997 
J.LEAGUE OFFICIAL GUIDE 1998, 1996 
J.LEAGUE YEARBOOK 1999, 1999

Other pages
 J. League official site
 Kashiwa Reysol official site

Kashiwa Reysol
Kashiwa Reysol seasons